Cocoa Exchange may refer to:
New York Cocoa Exchange, a former commodity futures exchange where cocoa was bought and sold
Coffee, Sugar and Cocoa Exchange, created by the merger of the New York Cocoa Exchange and New York Coffee and Sugar Exchange 
1 Wall Street Court, a building in Manhattan where the New York Cocoa Exchange had its trading floor and offices
 London Commodity Exchange, which merged to become London International Financial Futures and Options Exchange

See also
Cocoa (disambiguation)
List of commodities exchanges